Pyrausta theialis is a moth in the family Crambidae. It was described by Francis Walker in 1859. It is found on Borneo.

References

Moths described in 1859
theialis
Moths of Borneo